A ghazi (plural ġuzāt) is an individual who participated in ghazw, meaning military expeditions or raiding. The latter term was applied in early Islamic literature to expeditions led by the Islamic prophet Muhammad, and later taken up by Turkic military leaders to describe their wars of conquest. 

In the context of the wars between Russia and the Muslim peoples of the Caucasus, starting as early as the late 18th century's Sheikh Mansur's resistance to Russian expansion, the word usually appears in the form gazavat.

In English-language literature, the ghazw often appears as razzia, a borrowing through French from Maghrebi Arabic.

In modern Turkish, gazi is used to refer to veterans, and also as a title for Turkic Muslim champions such as Ertuğrul and Osman I.

Ghazw as raid—razzia 
In pre-Islamic Bedouin culture, ghazw[a] was a form of limited warfare verging on brigandage that avoided head-on confrontations and instead emphasized raiding and looting, usually of livestock (see cattle raiding). The Umayyad-period Bedouin poet al-Kutami wrote the oft-quoted verses: "Our business is to make raids on the enemy, on our neighbor and our own brother, in the event we find none to raid but a brother." William Montgomery Watt hypothesized that Muhammad found it useful to divert this continuous internecine warfare toward his enemies, making it the basis of his war strategy; according to Watt, the celebrated battle of Badr started as one such razzia. As a form of warfare, the razzia was then mimicked by the Christian states of Iberia in their relations with the taifa states; rough synonyms and similar tactics are the Iberian cavalgada and the Anglo-French chevauchée.

The word razzia was used in French colonial context particularly for raids to plunder and capture slaves from among the people of Western and Central Africa, also known as rezzou when practiced by the Tuareg. The word was adopted from ġaziya of Algerian Arabic vernacular and later became a figurative name for any act of pillage, with its verb form razzier.

Historical development

Ghazi is an Arabic word, the active participle of the verb ġazā, meaning 'to carry out a military expedition or raid'; the same verb can also mean 'to strive for' and Ghazi can thus share a similar meaning to Mujahid or "one who struggles". The verbal noun of ġazā is ġazw or ġazawān, with the meaning 'raiding'. A derived singulative in ġazwah refers to a single battle or raid. The term ghāzī dates to at least the Samanid period, where he appears as a mercenary and frontier fighter in Khorasan and Transoxiana. Later, up to 20,000 of them took part in the Indian campaigns of Mahmud of Ghazni.

Ghāzī warriors depended upon plunder for their livelihood, and were prone to brigandage and sedition in times of peace. The corporations into which they organized themselves attracted adventurers, zealots and religious and political dissidents of all ethnicities. In time, though, soldiers of Turkic ethnicity predominated, mirroring the acquisition of Mamluks, Turkic slaves in the Mamluk retinues and guard corps of the caliphs and emirs and in the ranks of the ghazi corporation, some of whom would ultimately rise to military and later political dominance in various Muslim states.

In the west, Turkic ghāzīs made continual incursions along the Byzantine frontier zone, finding in the akritai (akritoi) their Greek counterparts.  After the Battle of Manzikert these incursions intensified, and the region's people would see the ghāzī corporations coalesce into semi-chivalric fraternities, with the white cap and the club as their emblems. The height of the organizations would come during the Mongol conquest when many of them fled from Persia and Turkistan into Anatolia.

As organizations, the ghazi corporations were fluid, reflecting their popular character, and individual ghāzī warriors would jump between them depending upon the prestige and success of a particular emir, rather like the mercenary bands around western condottiere.  It was from these Anatolian territories conquered during the ghazw that the Ottoman Empire emerged, and in its legendary traditions it is said that its founder, Osman I, came forward as a ghāzī thanks to the inspiration of Shaikh Ede Bali.

In later periods of Islamic history the honorific title of ghāzī was assumed by those Muslim rulers who showed conspicuous success in extending the domains of Islam, and eventually the honorific became exclusive to them, much as the Roman title imperator became the exclusive property of the supreme ruler of the Roman state and his family.

The Ottomans were probably the first to adopt this practice, and in any case the institution of ghazw reaches back to the beginnings of their state:

 By early Ottoman times it had become a title of honor and a claim to leadership.  In an inscription of 1337 [concerning the building of the Bursa mosque], Orhan, second ruler of the Ottoman line, describes himself as "Sultan, son of the Sultan of the Gazis, Gazi son of Gazi… frontier lord of the horizons."
Ottoman historian Ahmedi in his work explain the meaning of Ghazi:

A Ghazi is the instrument of the religion of Allah, a servant of God who purifies the earth from the filth of polytheism. The Ghazi is the sword of God, he is the protector and the refuge of the believers. If he becomes a martyr in the ways of God, do not believe that he has died, he lives in beatitude with Allah, he has eternal life.

The first nine Ottoman chiefs all used Ghazi as part of their full throne name (as with many other titles, the nomination was added even though it did not fit the office), and often afterwards. However, it never became a formal title within the ruler's formal style, unlike Sultan ul-Mujahidin, used by Sultan Murad Khan II Khoja-Ghazi, 6th Sovereign of the House of Osman (1421–1451), styled 'Abu'l Hayrat, Sultan ul-Mujahidin, Khan of Khans, Grand Sultan of Anatolia and Rumelia, and of the Cities of Adrianople and Philippolis.

Because of the political legitimacy that would accrue to those bearing this title, Muslim rulers vied amongst themselves for preeminence in the ghāziya, with the Ottoman Sultans generally acknowledged as excelling all others in this feat:

 For political reasons the Ottoman Sultans — also being the last dynasty of Caliphs — attached the greatest importance to safeguarding and strengthening the reputation which they enjoyed as ghāzīs in the Muslim world. When they won victories in the ghazā in the Balkans they used to send accounts of them (singular, feth-nāme) as well as slaves and booty to eastern Muslim potentates. Christian knights captured by Bāyezīd I at his victory over the Crusaders at Nicopolis in 1396, and sent to Cairo, Baghdad and Tabriz were paraded through the streets, and occasioned great demonstrations in favour of the Ottomans. (Cambridge History of Islam, p. 290)

Ghazi was also used as a title of honor in the Ottoman Empire, generally translated as the Victorious, for military officers of high rank, who distinguished themselves in the field against non-Moslem enemies; thus it was conferred on Osman Pasha after his famous defence of Plevna in Bulgaria and on Mustafa Kemal Pasha (later known as Mustafa Kemal Atatürk) for leading the defense against the Gallipoli campaign.

Some Muslim rulers (in Afghanistan) personally used the subsidiary style Padshah-i-Ghazi.

Muhammad's Ghazwa

Ghazwah, which literally means "campaigns", is typically used by biographers to refer to all the Prophet's journeys from Medina, whether to make peace treaties and preach Islam to the tribes, to go on ʽumrah, to pursue enemies who attacked Medina, or to engage in the nine battles.

Muhammad participated in 27 Ghazwa. The first Ghazwa he participated in was the Invasion of Waddan in August 623, he ordered his followers to attack a Quraysh caravan.

Operationally
When performed within the context of Islamic warfare, the ghazw'''s function was to weaken the enemy's defenses in preparation for his eventual conquest and subjugation. Because the typical ghazw raiding party often did not have the size or strength to seize military or territorial objectives, this usually meant sudden attacks on weakly defended targets (e.g. villages) with the intent of demoralizing the enemy and destroying material which could support their military forces. Though Islam's rules of warfare offered protection to non-combatants such as women, monastics and peasants in that they could not be slain, their property could still be looted or destroyed, and they themselves could be abducted and enslaved (Cambridge History of Islam, p. 269):

The only way of avoiding the onslaughts of the ghāzīs was to become subjects of the Islamic state.  Non-Muslims acquired the status of dhimmīs, living under its protection. Most Christian sources confuse these two stages in the Ottoman conquests. The Ottomans, however, were careful to abide by these rules... Faced with the terrifying onslaught of the ghāzīs, the population living outside the confines of the empire, in the 'abode of war', often renounced the ineffective protection of Christian states, and sought refuge in subjection to the Ottoman Empire. Peasants in open country in particular lost nothing by this change.Cambridge History of Islam, p. 285

A good source on the conduct of the traditional ghazw raid are the medieval Islamic jurists, whose discussions as to which conduct is allowed and which is forbidden in the course of warfare reveal some of the practices of this institution.  One such source is Averroes' Bidāyat al-Mujtahid wa-Nihāyat al-Muqtasid (translated in Peters, Jihad in Classical and Modern Islam: A Reader, Chapter 4).

Use in the modern era

In the 19th century, Muslim fighters in North Caucasus who were resisting the Russian military operations declared a gazawat (understood as holy war) against the Russian Orthodox invasion. Although uncertain, it is believed that Dagestani Islamic scholar Muhammad Yaragskii was the ideologist of this holy war. In 1825, a congress of ulema in the village of Yarag declared gazawat against the Russians. Its first leader was Ghazi Muhammad; after his death, Imam Shamil would eventually continue it.

After the terrorist attacks on Paris in November 2015, the Islamic State group is said to have referred to its actions as "ghazwa".

In modern Turkey, gazi is used to refer to veterans. 19 September is celebrated as Veterans Day in Turkey.

Notable examples
 Battal Ghazi, 8th century, Arab military commander
 Ahmad ibn Ibrahim al-Ghazi, 16th century general and Imam of the Adal Sultanate
 Belek Ghazi, Bey of the Artuqids
 Gazi Gümüshtigin, second ruler of the Danishmendids
 Danishmend Gazi 12th century, founder of the Danishmendids
 Ertuğrul Gazi (13th century), leader of the Kayı tribe, father of Osman I
 Osman Gazi (1299–1326), founder of the Ottoman Empire
 Orhan Gazi (1281–1362), second Ottoman Sultan
 Ghazavat-i Sultan Murad, sixth Ottoman Sultan 
 Gazi Chelebi (14th century), pirate and ruler of Sinop, Turkey
 Gazi Evrenos (1288–1417), Ottoman military commander
 Sikandar Khan Ghazi, a military commander during the 1303 Conquest of Sylhet
 Haydar Ghazi, second wazir of Sylhet who fought in the 1303 Conquest of Sylhet
 Ikhtiyaruddin Ghazi Shah, 14th-century Sultan of Sonargaon
 Shahzada Danyal Dulal Ghazi, Prince of Bengal who fought in the 1498 Conquest of Kamata 
 Gazi-Husrev Beg, an Ottoman bey of Bosnian origin (1480–1541)
 Ghazi Khan, 15th century Baloch Chief from Dera Ghazi Khan, India
 Ğazı I Giray, 16th century Crimean Tatar khan
 Gazi Osman Pasha (1832–1897), Ottoman field marshal
 Ghazi Saiyyad Salar Masud (1014–1034), Ghaznavid military commander
 Gazi Saiyyed Salar Sahu (early 11th century), Ghaznavid military commander
 Ghazi Amanullah Khan, King of Afghanistan from 1919 to 1929
 Ghazi Mustafa Kemal (1881–1938), Turkish field marshal, first president of Turkey
 Nasir I of Kalat, 18th-century King of Balochistan with surname Ghazi-e-Din Abdul Rashid Ghazi

Related terms
 Akıncı: (Turkish) "raider", a later replacement for ghāzī al-'Awāsim: the Syrio-Anatolian frontier area between the Byzantine and various caliphal empires
 ribāt: fortified convent used by a militant religious order; most commonly used in North Africa
 thughūr: an advanced/frontier fortress
 uc: Turkish term for frontier; uc beği (frontier lord) was a title assumed by early Ottoman rulers; later replaced by serhadd (frontier)
 MujahideenSee also
 Gaza Thesis
 Jihad(ism)
 Fedayeen
 Janissary
 Spread of Islam
 Muslim conquests
 Battle of Hamra al-Asad
 Anatolian Beyliks

References

Further reading
 
 
 , p. 74
 , p. 34
 
 Averroes, Bidāyat al-Mujtahid wa-Nihāyat al-Muqtasid''
 
 
 
 
 Kaziev, Shapi. Imam Shamil. "Molodaya Gvardiya" publishers. Moscow, 2001, 2003, 2006, 2010. 
 Kaziev, Shapi. Akhoulgo. Caucasian War of 19th century. The historical novel. "Epoch", Publishing house. Makhachkala, 2008. 
 

Battles of Muhammad
Conversion to Islam
Islamic terminology
Jihad
Military history of Islam
Warriors